This list covers all the passenger railway stations and halts in Schleswig-Holstein, a state in northern Germany, that are served by timetabled services.

Description

The list is organised as follows:

 Name: This is the current name of the station or halt.
 Urban/Rural County (Kreis): This column gives the urban or rural county (Kreis) in which the station is located. Where abbreviations are used, these correspond to those used on German vehicle number plates. The following is a list of the urban and rural counties in Schleswig-Holstein with their abbreviations:

 Flensburg (FL)
 Dithmarschen (HEI)
 Hansestadt Lübeck (HL)
 Steinburg (IZ)
 Kiel (KI)
 Nordfriesland (NF)
 Neumünster (NMS)
 Stormarn (OD)
 Ostholstein (OH)
 Pinneberg (PI)
 Plön (district) (PLÖ)
 Rendsburg-Eckernförde (RD)
 Herzogtum Lauenburg (RZ)
 Segeberg (SE)
 Schleswig-Flensburg (SL)

 Railway operator: Schleswig-Holstein has three railway operators integrated into the SPNV. These are the Hamburger Verkehrsverbund (HVV) in the south of the state, the Tarifgemeinschaft Lübeck (TGL) in the area of the Hanseatic city of Lübeck and the Verkehrsverbund Region Kiel (VRK) 
 Cat: The Cat column shows the current category of the station as at 1 January 2012. This only affects stations run by DB Station&Service and excludes stations run by private operators, like the Norddeutsche Eisenbahngesellschaft (neg).
 The five following columns show the type of trains that stop at the station. The individual abbreviations used are based on the train classifications used for DB AG trains, but may also refer to the equivalent services of other operators:
 ICE – Intercity-Express and the like
 IC – Intercity, Eurocity and the like
 RE – Regional-Express and the like
 RB – Regionalbahn and the like
 S – S-Bahn
 Line – This column gives the railway line on which the station is situated. Only routes that are still in service on this section are named, e.g. the stations at Elmshorn and Bad Oldesloe are both on the Elmshorn-Barmstedt-Oldesloe line, however this is only working between Elmshorn and Henstedt-Ulzburg.
 Remarks – In this column additional information may be given that is not covered elsewhere, especially the name of the railway operator.

Station overview

See also
German railway station categories
Railway station types of Germany

References

External links 

 Station categorisation by DB Station+Service AG until 31 December 2010
 Online timetable of DB services

 
Schl
Rail